Damian Dacewicz (born 28 September 1974) is a Polish former volleyball player. He competed in the men's tournament at the 1996 Summer Olympics.

References

External links
 

1974 births
Living people
Polish men's volleyball players
Olympic volleyball players of Poland
Volleyball players at the 1996 Summer Olympics
Sportspeople from Katowice
AZS Częstochowa players
Skra Bełchatów players
MKS Będzin coaches